The 1932 United States House of Representatives elections in Virginia were held on November 8, 1932, to determine who will represent the Commonwealth of Virginia in the United States House of Representatives. Representatives are elected for two-year terms.  Virginia had only nine seats in the House, losing a seat due to re-apportionment following the 1930 United States census.  This election was unique because all representatives were elected at-large instead of the previously used electoral district system.  However, this idea was not popular and the state returned to using electoral districts in the next election.

Overview

Results

References

See also
 United States House elections, 1932

Virginia
1932
1932 Virginia elections